Kandwa is a census town in Varanasi district in the Indian state of Uttar Pradesh.

Demographics
At the 2001 India census, Kandwa had a population of 7,762. Males constituted 53% of the population and females 47%. Kandwa had an average literacy rate of 64%, higher than the national average of 59.5%: male literacy was 74%, and female literacy was 52%. In Kandwa, 17% of the population was under 6 years of age.

Karmdeshwer Temple is situated in Kandwa. The people of Kandwa believe that Shiv Jee's first steps in Varanasi were in Kandwa.

References

Census towns in Varanasi district
Cities and towns in Varanasi district